Nagardeole is a census town in Jalgaon District in the Indian State of Maharashtra.

Demographics
In the 2001 India census, Nagardeole had a population of 13,715. Males constituted 52% of the population and females 48%. Nagardeole has an average literacy rate of 79%, higher than the national average of 59.5%: male literacy was 83%, and female literacy was 74%. In Nagardeole, 13% of the population was under 6 years of age.

References

Cities and towns in Jalgaon district